Alexander Harvey II (May 3, 1923 – December 4, 2017) was a United States district judge of the United States District Court for the District of Maryland.

Education and career

Born in Baltimore, Maryland, Harvey was in the United States Army during World War II, from 1943 to 1946. He received a Bachelor of Arts degree from Yale University in 1947, and a Bachelor of Laws from Columbia Law School in 1950. He was in private practice of law in Baltimore from 1950 to 1966, and was an assistant state attorney general of Maryland from 1955 to 1957.

Federal judicial service

On September 9, 1966, President Lyndon B. Johnson nominated Harvey to a seat on the United States District Court for the District of Maryland vacated by Judge Harrison Lee Winter. Harvey was confirmed by the United States Senate on September 22, 1966, and received his commission the same day. He served as Chief Judge from 1986 to 1991, and assumed senior status on March 8, 1991, and took inactive status on January 30, 2004. Harvey died on December 4, 2017, in Baltimore, at the age of 94.

See also
 List of United States federal judges by longevity of service

References

External links
 

1923 births
2017 deaths
United States Army personnel of World War II
Columbia Law School alumni
Deaths from cancer in Maryland
Deaths from prostate cancer
Lawyers from Baltimore
Judges of the United States District Court for the District of Maryland
Military personnel from Baltimore
United States district court judges appointed by Lyndon B. Johnson
20th-century American judges